(Igal)  Mark Scheinberg (born 1973) is an Israeli-Canadian businessman and investor with investments in various sectors including real estate and luxury hospitality. He is the co-founder and former co-owner of the online gambling company PokerStars, which was sold in 2014 to Amaya Gaming for $4.9 billion.

life
Mark Scheinberg was born in Israel in 1973, moving to Toronto, Ontario, Canada at the age of 13 with his family. They settled in the town of Richmond Hill in the 1980s.

Career
In 2001 Scheinberg founded PokerStars with his father Isai Scheinberg, a computer programmer. During his tenure as CEO, PokerStars became the world’s largest online poker business and host to the world’s largest online tournament series, acquiring the Full Tilt Poker brand in 2012. In August 2014, Oldford Group Ltd, the PokerStars parent company, was acquired by the Canadian publicly listed company Amaya Gaming Group for $4.9 billion. Upon completion of the sale, Scheinberg exited the PokerStars group. As of May 2017, Scheinberg was the richest person on the Isle of Man.

Via his investment company Mohari Hospitality, in early 2017 Scheinberg became a major investor in Centro Canalejas Madrid, a real estate project in Madrid, Spain. Mohari purchased a 50% stake in the Centro for €225 million from the Grupo OHL subsidiary OHL Desarrollos and the industrial group Villa Mir, who both also retained stakes. With an opening date set for 2019, the project involves the restoration of seven historic adjacent buildings for residential, hotel and commercial use. With a large amount of retail space, the complex will also house the first Four Seasons hotel in Spain, and create 4,800 positions.

In September 2017, a Canadian subsidiary of Mohari Hospitality acquired the Thompson Toronto hotel in downtown Toronto, Ontario. The "boutique" hotel has 105 rooms, event space, and restaurants and lounges.

According to The Sunday Times Rich List in 2021, his net worth was estimated at £3.519 billion.

Personal life
Scheinberg is single and lives in the Isle of Man. In March 2020 he and his family founded The Scheinberg Relief Fund, to help tackle the direct impact of COVID-19. With an allocation of $50 million, it supports organisations and initiatives in locations where the family has a business or personal presence.

Scheinberg has a keen interest in conservation and animal welfare. In September 2020, it was announced that The Scheinberg Relief Fund would match every donation to the Wildlife Ranger Challenge, a conservation fundraiser that work with charities like the Save the Rhino Trust.

References 

PokerStars
1973 births
Living people
Israeli businesspeople
Israeli billionaires
Israeli emigrants to Canada
Israeli Jews
Canadian businesspeople
Canadian billionaires
Canadian Jews
People from Richmond Hill, Ontario
21st-century Manx people
Poker people
People named in the Paradise Papers